The Iranian missile boat Paykan is an Iranian-made .

Design

Paykan was Iran's first self-made missile boat and is equipped with two or four C802 SSM anti-ship missiles, one Fajr-27 76 mm dual-purpose gun and one 40 mm anti-aircraft gun.

Paykan was built in memory of the original , that sank three Iraqi Navy Osa II boats in 1980 during Operation Morvarid, it also has the same pennant number as the original one.

See also 

 List of current ships of the Islamic Republic of Iran Navy
 List of military equipment manufactured in Iran

References

External links
 News about the Paykan (29 September 2003 section)
 Iran launches Paykan missile boat in Caspian waters
 Picture of Paykan

Missile boats of the Islamic Republic of Iran Navy
Ships built at Shahid Tamjidi shipyard
Ships of the Islamic Republic of Iran Navy
Ships built in Iran
Missile boats of Iran